Year 1428 (MCDXXVIII) was a leap year starting on Thursday (link will display the full calendar) of the Julian calendar.

Events 
 January–December 
 February 2 – 1428 Catalonia earthquake. The earthquake takes place during Candlemas, striking the region of Catalonia, especially Roussillon, with an epicentre near Camprodon. The earthquake is one of a series of related seismic events that shake Catalonia in a single year. Beginning on 23 February 1427, tremors are felt in March, April, 15 May at Olot. 
 June 3 – Dan II leads an army against the Ottomans at Golubac Fortress, obtaining a treaty that will allow him a semi-peaceful rule in Wallachia, until 1432.
 August 30 – Emperor Go-Hanazono accedes to the throne of Japan.
 October 12 – English forces under Thomas Montacute, 4th Earl of Salisbury, besiege Orléans. Jean de Dunois, the Bastard of Orléans, commands the defenders.
 October 24 – Thomas Montacute, 4th Earl of Salisbury, is mortally wounded in an unsuccessful assault on Orléans. He is succeeded in command by William de la Pole, 4th Earl of Suffolk.

 Date unknown 
 Itzcóatl becomes 1st emperor of the Aztec Empire.
 The Aztec Triple Alliance (also known as The Aztec Empire) forms with the alliance of three Aztec city-states—Tenochtitlán, Texcoco, and Tlacopán—and defeats Azcapotzalco to win control of the Valley of Mexico.
 The Valais witch trials begin. 
 A serious fire occurs at Baynard's Castle in London, England.
 Voices tell Joan of Arc that Charles VII of France must be crowned, and the English expelled from France.
 Lam Sơn uprising: Lê Lợi, founder of the Lê dynasty in Vietnam, liberates Annam (the territory occupied by Ming dynasty China in 1407), and restores the kingdom as Đại Việt.

Births 
 February 3 – Helena Palaiologina, Queen of Cyprus (d. 1458)
 April 7 – William Percy, late medieval Bishop of Carlisle (d. 1462)
 May 3 – Pedro González de Mendoza, Spanish cardinal and statesman (d. 1495)
 July 4 – Filippo Strozzi the Elder, Italian banker (d. 1491)
 September 21 – Jingtai Emperor of China (d. 1457)
 November 2 – Yolande, Duchess of Lorraine (d. 1483)
 November 22 – Richard Neville, 16th Earl of Warwick, English kingmaker (d. 1471)
 December 4 – Bernard VII, Lord of Lippe (1429–1511) (d. 1511)
 date unknown – Donato Acciaioli, Italian scholar (d. 1478)
 Maria Ormani, Italian artist, scribe and illuminator
 probable – Didrik Pining, German explorer (approximate date)

Deaths 
 January 4 – Frederick I, Elector of Saxony (b. 1370)
 February 3 – Ashikaga Yoshimochi, Japanese shōgun (b. 1386)
 June 12 – Zawisza Czarny, Polish knight and diplomat
 August 27 – John I of Münsterberg, Duke of Ziebice (b. 1370)
 August 30 – Emperor Shōkō, emperor of Japan (b. 1401)
 Autumn – Masaccio, Italian painter (b. 1401)
 November 3 – Thomas Montacute, 4th Earl of Salisbury, English military leader (mortally wounded in battle) (b. 1388)
 November 4 – Sophia of Bavaria, Queen regent of Bohemia (b. 1376)
 date unknown
 Maxtla, Tepanec ruler of Azcapotzalco
 Paul of Venice, Catholic theologian
 Isabella, Countess of Foix, French sovereign (b. 1361)
 probable – John Purvey, English theologian (b. 1353)

References